The 1980–81 Bulgarian Cup was the 41st season of the Bulgarian Cup (in this period the tournament was named Cup of the Soviet Army). Botev Plovdiv won the competition, beating Pirin Blagoevgrad 1–0 in the final at the Vasil Levski National Stadium.

First round

|-
!colspan=3 style="background-color:#D0F0C0;" |19 November 1980

|}

Second round

|-
!colspan=3 style="background-color:#D0F0C0;" |10, 11 and 25 December 1980

|}

Third round

|-
!colspan=4 style="background-color:#D0F0C0;" |15 February–4 March 1981

|}

Quarter-finals

|-
!colspan=4 style="background-color:#D0F0C0;" |11–18 March 1981

|}

Semi-finals

|-
!colspan=4 style="background-color:#D0F0C0;" |22 April 1981

|}

Final

Details

References

1980-81
1980–81 domestic association football cups
Cup